Fernando Fabián Fernández Acosta (born 8 January 1992) is a Paraguayan professional footballer who plays as a forward for Guaraní.

Career
Fernando began its journey from very small to become a player in football school called Cooperative Capiatá, later to move to Martín Ledesma their city natal. At the age of 13 years came to Guaraní, through each of the smaller categories before making his debut in the First Division in 2013.

In December 2015, Fernández was transferred to Mexican side Tigres UANL. On 24 January 2016, he scored his first goal with Tigres in a 2–2 draw against Chivas de Guadalajara at the Estadio Omnilife.

On 27 January 2017, Tigres announced that Fernández had been transferred to Club Olimpia in a 6-month loan deal.

Honours
UANL
Liga MX: Apertura 2016
 Campeón de Campeones: 2016

See also
 Players and Records in Paraguayan Football

References

1992 births
Living people
Paraguayan footballers
Paraguayan expatriate footballers
Club Guaraní players
Tigres UANL footballers
Club Olimpia footballers
Paraguayan Primera División players
Liga MX players
Expatriate footballers in Mexico
Association football forwards